"Welcome to My Nightmare" is the title track to Alice Cooper's eighth studio album. The song is written by Cooper, Dick Wagner and Bob Ezrin. It peaked at 45 on the Billboard Hot 100. The song itself mixes elements from disco, jazz, hard rock, and keeps a "heavy-yet-funky beat". Cooper would later perform the song on The Muppet Show. The tune was placed tenth on a list AOL Radio made of the "10 Best Halloween Songs".

Acoustic guitar is played by Dick Wagner, bass by Tony Levin, clarinet by Jozef Chirowski, drums by Johnny "Bee" Badanjek, and electric guitar by Steve Hunter.

Record World said that the single release that "Alice sounds downright
ghoulish on this re-mixed and edited lp track."

Cover versions
Ronnie James Dio, Steve Lukather, Bob Kulick, Phil Soussan, Randy Castillo and Paul Taylor covered the song on the 1999 tribute album Humanary Stew: A Tribute to Alice Cooper.

References

1975 singles
Alice Cooper songs
Songs written by Alice Cooper
Songs written by Dick Wagner
Songs written by Bob Ezrin
Song recordings produced by Bob Ezrin
Atlantic Records singles
1975 songs
Halloween songs